Senator Fowler may refer to:

Members of the United States Senate
Joseph S. Fowler (1820–1902), U.S. Senator from Tennessee from 1866 to 1871
Wyche Fowler (born 1940), U.S. Senator from Georgia from 1987 to 1993

United States state senate members
Bernie Fowler (born 1924), Maryland State Senate
Chuck Fowler (born 1939), Minnesota State Senate
Dale Fowler (fl. 2010s–2020s), Illinois State Senate
David Fowler (politician) (born 1958), Tennessee State Senate
H. Robert Fowler (1851–1926), Illinois State Senate
J. Samuel Fowler (1873–1961), New York State Senate
James Fowler (Massachusetts politician) (1788–1873), 
Orin Fowler (1791–1852), Massachusetts State Senate
William Chauncey Fowler (1793–1881), Connecticut State Senate

See also
Fowler (surname)